The XIX Art is a Swiss single-place paraglider that was designed by Michi Kobler and produced by XIX GmbH of Kronbühl in the mid-2000s. It is now out of production.

Design and development
The Art was designed as a beginner to intermediate glider. The models are each named for their approximate projected wing area in square metres, plus relative size.

Variants
Art XS 22
Extra small-sized model for lighter pilots. The glider model is Deutscher Hängegleiterverband e.V. (DHV) 2 certified.
Art XS 24
Small-sized model for lighter pilots. The glider model is DHV 1-2 certified.
Art M 26
Mid-sized model for medium-weight pilots. The glider model is DHV 1-2 certified.
Art L 28
Large-sized model for heavier pilots. The glider model is DHV 1-2 certified.

Specifications (Art M 26)

References

Art
Paragliders